The Student of Prague (in German, Der Student von Prag) may refer to:

 The Student of Prague (1913 film), a German silent film by Stellan Rye
 The Student of Prague (1926 film), a remake of the original film by Henrik Galeen
 The Student of Prague (1935 film), a German film directed by Arthur Robison and starring Anton Walbrook
 The Student of Prague (painting), a 1983 painting by Julian Schnabel